Baifa Monü Zhuan is a wuxia novel by Liang Yusheng first published as a serial between 5 August 1957 and 10 December 1958 in the Hong Kong newspaper Sin Wun Pao. Considered the first part of the Tianshan series of novels by Liang Yusheng, it is closely related to the second and third parts of the series: Saiwai Qixia Zhuan and Qijian Xia Tianshan. The novel has also been loosely adapted into films and television series, such as The Bride with White Hair (1993) and The Romance of the White Hair Maiden (1995), and The White Haired Witch of Lunar Kingdom (2014).

The novel has been variously translated as Biography of the White-Haired Succuba and Romance of the White-Haired Maiden.

Plot 
The story is set in 17th-century China towards the end of the Ming dynasty. Lian Nichang, a bandit leader nicknamed "Jade Rakshasa", is a legendary vigilante swordswoman who uses her skills to uphold justice in the jianghu (martial artists' community). However, she is also notorious for being extremely brutal towards evil-doers and her enemies, making her a highly dreaded figure in the jianghu. Meanwhile, many government officials are implicated in a scandal to overthrow the crown prince, and they are either executed or imprisoned. Zhuo Yihang, a swordsman of the Wudang School, helps the crown prince uncover the truth behind the case and succeeds in clearing the name of his father, who had been wrongly put to death.

On the journey home, Zhuo Yihang passes by Mount Hua, where he meets a beautiful young maiden and falls in love with her. The following night, when he agrees to combine forces with some martial artists to deal with a dangerous foe, he is shocked to learn that the woman he met earlier is actually their target: the "Jade Rakshasa". More startlingly, he finds out that the martial artists he is helping are actually spies working for the Manchus, so he quickly switches sides and helps Lian Nichang defeat the spies. Zhuo Yihang and Lian Nichang also meet and befriend a formidable swordsman, Yue Mingke, who is serving as a military attaché under the general Xiong Tingbi. Yue Mingke and Lian Nichang spar with each other and realise that their respective masters used to be a loving couple, but have separated due to a rivalry over achieving supremacy in swordsmanship.

In the meantime, the Taichang Emperor dies after consuming the mysterious Red Pills and is succeeded by his young and naïve son, the Tianqi Emperor. The influential court eunuch Wei Zhongxian and the emperor's wet nurse Madam Ke seize the opportunity to manipulate the new emperor and turn him into a puppet ruler under their control. With backing from his supporters, Wei Zhongxian starts persecuting his political opponents and those loyal to the emperor in order to gain more power. Lian Nichang, Zhuo Yihang and Yue Mingke side with the loyalists and oppose Wei Zhongxian, playing key roles in disrupting Wei Zhongxian's plans in their respective adventures. Wei Zhongxian eventually meets his downfall when the Tianqi Emperor dies and the Chongzhen Emperor succeeds him. At one point, Yue Mingke is devastated after his lover, Tie Shanhu, dies tragically at the hands of Wei Zhongxian's henchmen. Feeling disillusioned with the power struggles in society, he becomes a Buddhist monk under the name "Reverend Huiming" and moves to the Mount Heaven region, where he spends his time meditating and practising martial arts.

During this time, Zhuo Yihang and Lian Nichang develop a romance, and Zhuo Yihang is poised to succeed his master as the leader of the Wudang School. However, as Lian Nichang has had past misunderstandings and conflicts with the Wudang School, the elders of the Wudang School strongly oppose his relationship with Lian Nichang. During a duel between Lian Nichang and the Wudang elders, Zhuo Yihang intervenes and accidentally attacks Lian Nichang, causing her to mistakenly believe that he has betrayed her. Heartbroken, Lian Nichang leaves Zhuo Yihang and her hair turns white after she awakes from a long sleep. Depressed by her new looks, she travels to Mount Heaven to join Reverend Humming in leading a reclusive life there.

Some years later, Lian Nichang makes her name in the Mount Heaven region by slaying villains and defeating several martial arts experts. However, as she still retains her aggressive personality, the locals call her the "White Haired Demoness". Meanwhile, Zhuo Yihang suffers from an emotional breakdown after losing Lian Nichang, and he leaves the Wudang School to search for his lover. After a long journey, Zhuo Yihang finally meets Lian Nichang on Mount Heaven, but she remains cold and indifferent towards him, refusing to accept his apologies. Zhuo Yihang learns that there is a rare flower that can turn white hair black again, but the flower only blooms once every six decades. He finds it and waits, hoping that it will bloom one day and help him mend his relationship with Lian Nichang.

Characters

Adaptations

Films

Television

References 

 
Novels by Liang Yusheng
1958 novels
Novels set in the Ming dynasty
Novels first published in serial form
Works originally published in Hong Kong newspapers
Novels set in the 17th century
Shun dynasty